Bärbel Schäfer (born 16 December 1963 in Bremen) is a German television presenter and talk show host.

Life 
Schäfer works in Germany as television presenter and talk show host. In 2004 Schäfer married Michel Friedman in Eschborn, only shortly after Friedman was convicted in a case involving forced prostitution and drug usage. In her 2005 novel "Wer, wenn nicht er?" (Who if not he?) she loosely reflects on her mixed emotions concerning her marriage with Friedman the previous year.

Works 
 together with Susanne Luerweg: Wer, wenn nicht er? Roman, 2005, 
 together with Monika Schuck: Ich wollte mein Leben zurück. Rütten & Loening, 2006, 
 together with Susanne Luerweg: Schaumküsse. Diana Verlag, 2007, 
 together with Monika Schuck: Die besten Jahre: Frauen erzählen vom Älterwerden. Kiepenheuer Verlag, 2008 
 together with Monika Schuck: Das Glücksgeheimnis: Paare erzählen vom Gelingen ihrer Liebe. Kiepenheuer Verlag, 2009

Awards 
 Goldene Kamera for talk show Bärbel Schäfer

References

External links 
 Official website by Bärbel Schäfer
 Spiegel:Bärbel Schäfer
 

German television presenters
German women television presenters
German television talk show hosts
Mass media people from Bremen
Living people
1963 births
RTL Group people